Francis Okombi (born 15 October 1996) is a Congolese footballer who plays as a defender for CSMD Diables Noirs.

International career
At the youth level he played in 2015 African U-20 Championship qualifiers, scoring against Niger.

References

1996 births
Living people
Republic of the Congo footballers
Republic of the Congo international footballers
Republic of the Congo youth international footballers
Étoile du Congo players
CARA Brazzaville players
CSMD Diables Noirs players
Association football defenders
Sportspeople from Brazzaville